Michael John "Lefty" Sebastian (June 7, 1910 – June 28, 1989) was an American football halfback in the National Football League for the Cincinnati Reds, Boston Redskins, Philadelphia Eagles, Pittsburgh Pirates, (later renamed the Steelers) and the Cleveland Rams. Nicknamed the Rose of Sharon, he also played for the Rams while they were still members of the second American Football League as well as the AFL's Rochester Tigers. Prior to his professional career, Sebastian played college football at the University of Pittsburgh. At Pitt, he played under coach Jock Sutherland, who had declared Sebastian the best passer whom he had seen in "many days."

Early life
Sebastian was born in Luxor, Pennsylvania, a coal mining "patch town", located near Greensburg.  He attended Sharon High School in Sharon, Pennsylvania where he played football and track, earning All-State honors in both sports. In 1928 Sebastian earned national attention when he scored ten touchdowns contributing to 63 points in just one game.

College career
Sebastian earned a scholarship to the University of Pittsburgh, where he again starred in both football and track. He played football as a fullback and held the 1931 Pittsburgh Panthers football team to a shared national championship].

On November 5, 1932, Sebastian faked a pass, cut for the west sidelines, reversed his field, for a 45-yard touchdown run against a heavily favored Notre Dame.  Pitt won the game 12–0 for the first victory in the rivalry. That same year Sebastian caught a ball for 52 yards in a 0–0 tie against Ohio State.  Sportswriter John Dietrich of The Plain Dealer later called the game "one of the thrillers of a lifetime." Sebastian contributed to a hard-fought 19–12 Pitt victory over Penn by catching a 27-yard touchdown pass late in the game.

On October 28, 1933, Sebastian's 75-yard touchdown run highlighted a 14–0 win over Duke. In 1930, and again in 1933, he played in the Rose Bowl, which resulted in a 47–14 and 35–0 losses to the USC Trojans.

In 1934 Sebastian played, and was the starting running back, in the first College All-Star Game. The game which became a tradition from 1934 until 1974 was played between the National Football League (NFL) champions and a team of star college seniors from the previous year. That very first game, was played on August 31, 1934 before a crowd of 79,432 at Chicago's Soldier Field. The game resulted in a scoreless tie between the all-stars and the Chicago Bears. That year Sebastian also played in the second East–West Shrine Game in Chicago.

Professional career
After college, Sebastian went on to a pro football career. He began his career with Cincinnati Reds in 1934, where he is uncredit by most sources for playing with the team. However, he was signed by the team just prior to a game against the Chicago Cardinals. He split the 1935 season between three teams: the Boston Redskins, Philadelphia Eagles and the Pittsburgh Pirates. It is not known the order of the teams he played for in 1935. Some records show that he made his start with the Pirates, but there is also a signed original copy of his contract with the Chicago Cardinals, which offered Sebastian $120 per game (see below); however, there are no existing statistics to prove that he played for Chicago.

In 1936 Sebastian played for the Passaic Red Devils of the minor league American Association. The following year Sebastian returned to the NFL with the Cleveland Rams. The Rams were a charter member of the second American Football League in 1936. Although the NFL granted membership in 1937 to the same owner, the NFL considers it a separate entity since only four of the players (William "Bud" Cooper, Harry "The Horse" Mattos, Stan Pincura, and Sebastian) and none of the team's management made the transfer to the Rams' NFL team. In 1937, Sebastian and Harry Newman were mainstays on the AFL's Rochester Tigers. In 1938, he served a player-coach for the St. Louis Gunners of the American Football League.

Sebastian's career ended due to knee and hip problems which not only ended his career, but would eventually end his life.

Rushing stats

Receiving stats

Passing stats

Coaching career
Sebastian retired from playing in 1938 and went back to school to earn a master's degree. He was appointed assistant coach at Rochester Area High School in 1946, with his team going 9–1 that first season. When head coach Earl Ewing resigned, Sebastian  was made head coach for the 1947 campaign and made an instant splash with an 8–0–1 team that featured Babe Parilli. He stayed with the Rams three more years, compiling an overall record of 23–12–4.

In 1951, Ambridge High School hired Sebastian as their coach. His first-team went 7–1–2 and in 1954 the Bridgers finished with an 8–0–1 record that started a four-year 31–5–2 run. His 1956 team was 9–0 and outscored their opponents 367 to 51. Sebastian continued to coach Ambridge through the 1961 season to an overall record of 64–38–4. Afterwards he  moved on to New Castle, where he taught classes and coached football before retiring in 1974.

Later life and honors
Sebastian retired to Hemet, California, where he remained active playing golf and other activities. However, his inability to stay active due to pain in his hip made him decide to get hip replacement surgery. He died on June 28, 1989, as a result of hepatitis contracted during the procedure. He was 79 years old.

In 2002 Sebastian was inducted into the Mercer County Sports Hall of Fame. Then in 2007 Sebastian was inducted into Beaver County's Sports Hall of Fame.

Personal
Sebastian married Genevieve Micko on March 3, 1934. He is interred in Sharon along with his wife, who passed in January 2005. She was 89 years old.

References

External links
 

1910 births
1989 deaths
American football fullbacks
American football halfbacks
Boston Redskins players
Cincinnati Reds (NFL) players
Cleveland Rams players
Cleveland Rams (AFL) players
Philadelphia Eagles players
Pittsburgh Panthers football players
Pittsburgh Pirates (football) players
Rochester Tigers players
St. Louis Gunners coaches
St. Louis Gunners players
High school football coaches in Pennsylvania
People from Westmoreland County, Pennsylvania
Players of American football from Pennsylvania